O. J. Simpson: Juice on the Loose is a sports documentary about O. J. Simpson directed in 1974 by George Romero.

Summary
The documentary follows the career of O.J. Simpson, the upcoming running back (#32) for the Buffalo Bills football team. This film also include highlights from the 1973 Buffalo Bills season with the day (December 16, 1973) O.J. became the first Pro football player to reach 2,000 yards in a single season.

Cast
 O. J. Simpson as himself
 Marvin Goux as himself
 Earl Edwards as himself
 Reggie McKenzie as himself
 Howard Cosell as himself
 Larry Felser as himself
 Dwight Chapin as himself
 Eunice Simpson as herself
 Shirley Baker as herself
 Carmelita Jackson as herself
 Melvin Simpson as himself
 AC Carenagens as himself
 Marilyn O'Brien as herself
 Chuck Barnes as himself
 Margarite Simpson as herself

Production
Filming took place in San Francisco.

Release and distribution
The film was produced by The Latent Image and originally aired on ABC on December 28, 1974. Romero wanted to name it "2003" because of O. J. Simpson's record number of yards rushing but ABC decided to change the title to "O. J. Simpson: Juice on the Loose". It was later re-released by Vidmark in 1994 during the O. J. Simpson murder case. The film is included as an "Easter egg" bonus feature on the DVD release of the spoof film The Bogus Witch Project (2000). It was re-released again in 2016 by Thomas Chaffee.

Legacy
The film was referenced in the title to the Family Guy episode about Simpson, "The Juice Is Loose" (March 15, 2009).

The film was referenced in "The Simpsons" episode She Used To Be My Girl.

References

External links

1974 films
1974 documentary films
American sports documentary films
Documentary films about American football
Films directed by George A. Romero
Cultural depictions of O. J. Simpson
Films shot in San Francisco
1970s English-language films
1970s American films